Hymenopappus filifolius is a North American species of flowering plant in the daisy family known by the common names fineleaf hymenopappus and Columbia cutleaf. It is native to western and central North America from Alberta and Saskatchewan south as far as Chihuahua and Baja California.

Hymenopappus filifolius grows in a number of habitats, often in arid regions. The plant is variable in appearance and there are a great number of varieties of the species. It is a taprooted perennial herb growing as a small clump on the ground to an erect spray of stems up to a meter (40 inches) tall. Almost all of the leaves are located at the base of the plant in a woolly gray-green patch. They are up to 20 centimeters (8 inches) long and are divided into blunt, thready leaflets. They are glandular and thinly hairy to quite woolly, and dark green under the coat of white wool. The stem ends in a branching inflorescence of knob-shaped discoid flower heads. They are filled with golden yellow or white disc florets. There are no ray florets.

There are many varieties, including:
Hymenopappus filifolius var. eriopodus – a white-flowered variety native from California, Nevada, Utah
Hymenopappus filifolius var. filifolius – Idaho, Oregon, Washington
Hymenopappus filifolius var. idahoensis – Idaho
Hymenopappus filifolius var. lugens – Arizona, California, Nevada, Utah, New Mexico, Baja California
Hymenopappus filifolius var. luteus – Utah, Wyoming, Colorado
Hymenopappus filifolius var. megacephalus – California, Nevada, Utah, Arizona, Colorado
Hymenopappus filifolius var. nanus – Arizona, California, Nevada, Utah
Hymenopappus filifolius var. nudipes  – Utah, Wyoming
Hymenopappus filifolius var. parvulus – Colorado
Hymenopappus filifolius var. pauciflorus – Utah, Arizona, Colorado
Hymenopappus filifolius var. polycephalus – Alberta, Saskatchewan, Colorado, Kansas, Montana, Nebraska, North Dakota, South Dakota, Wyoming
Hymenopappus filifolius var. tomentosus – Utah

Uses
The Zuni people apply a poultice of chewed root with lard to swellings. They also drink a warm decoction of the  root  as an emetic. They also use the root as chewing gum.

References

External links
Jepson Manual Treatment, University of California
United States Department of Agriculture Plants Profile
H. filifolius Calphotos Photo gallery, University of California
var. eriopodus Calphotos Photo gallery, University of California

filifolius
Plants used in Native American cuisine
Plants used in traditional Native American medicine
Plants described in 1833
Flora of North America